Judith West (or Judith West Edelman) is an entrepreneur businesswoman, political activist and radio personality who hosts her own cable network TV Show, Getting Your Money's Worth.

Owner and president of Westco Inc., based in New York City, she draws from her experience in business, education, philanthropy and activism to inspire people to seek achievement in their own lives. Having come from meager circumstances, West carved out a career in retail design and manufacturing before founding her own company, Westco. A privately held company, Westco designs and manufactures retail store fixturing for such blue chip companies as Disney, Universal Studios, the NBC Experience Store at Rockefeller Plaza and Caesar's, Las Vegas, among others. All of its manufacturing is done domestically.

Education
As a private citizen and former public school teacher, West is passionate about education, serving on the Board of Directors of the Center for Education Reform and active in promoting Charter Schools. She received a Bachelor of Science Degree in Economics from Hunter College following enrollment at Southern Methodist University in Dallas, Texas, her hometown. She then earned a Master of Arts degree in career counseling from Manhattan College in New York and was a doctoral candidate in business psychology at Fordham University. Prior to entering the retail world, she taught English as a second language and served as a curriculum and guidance director.

Awards
Westco is a national award winner, repeatedly winning annual awards from the National Association of Store Fixture Manufacturers (NASFM). Westco produced many fixtures for the World of Disney retail attractions in Orlando, Florida, Euro Disney and for their flagship store on Fifth Avenue in New York City. Westco's niche is to mix unusual materials and customized design incorporating the logo of the brand to create environments that drive clients' profits and strengthen their brands.

Her accolades include 2005 Business Woman of the Year Award, Business Advisory Council, National Republican Congressional Committee; Informal Advisor, Department of Education, Washington, D.C., "No Child Left Behind Workshop"; and Media Advisor, Women's National Forum.

Appearances
West is a popular personality, appearing on talk radio and television programs to discuss a variety of issues including education reform, school choice, women's entrepreneurship, retirement planning and business.

Public service
In addition to serving on the board of the Center for Education Reform, West is chairman of the Admission's Committee of the Excelsior Corporation Board of Trustees, member of the President's Council, Heritage Foundation, member of Development Committee, Count Me In, as well as a member of the Manhattan Institute and the National Association, Store Fixture Manufacturers.

References

External links
 Judith West

American businesspeople
American women in business
American radio personalities
American television talk show hosts
Manhattan College alumni
Living people
Year of birth missing (living people)
21st-century American women